The Miss District of Columbia competition is the pageant that selects the representative for the District of Columbia in the Miss America pageant.

Miss District of Columbia may also refer to:

 Miss District of Columbia USA, a subsidiary beauty pageant of Miss USA
 Miss District of Columbia Teen USA, a subsidiary beauty pageant of Miss Teen USA

See also
 
 Miss Columbia (disambiguation)
 Miss Colombia (disambiguation)
 District of Columbia (disambiguation)
 Columbia (disambiguation)
 Colombia (disambiguation)